Julianna  Margulies (born June 8, 1966) is an American actress. After several small television roles, Margulies received wide recognition for her starring role as Carol Hathaway on NBC's long-running medical drama series ER (1994–2009), for which she received a Primetime Emmy Award. In 2009, she took on the lead role of Alicia Florrick in the CBS legal drama The Good Wife (2009–2016). Her performance garnered acclaim, winning two Primetime Emmy Awards for Outstanding Lead Actress in a Drama Series, a Golden Globe Award, and a Television Critics Association Award.

In 2021, she began portraying character Laura Peterson on the Apple TV+ drama series The Morning Show, starring alongside Jennifer Aniston and Reese Witherspoon.

Margulies had a recurring role on The Sopranos (2006-2007). She also voiced Neera in the adventure film Dinosaur (2000) and appeared in the miniseries The Mists of Avalon (2001). Her other films include Evelyn (2002), Ghost Ship (2002), Snakes on a Plane (2006), City Island (2009), Stand Up Guys (2012), and The Upside (2017). She also had starring roles in the AMC dark comedy series Dietland (2018) and the National Geographic miniseries The Hot Zone (2019).

Margulies has won eight Screen Actor Guild Awards, making her the second most awarded woman ever within SAG after Julia Louis-Dreyfus, one Golden Globe Award, and three Primetime Emmy Awards. In 2015, Time magazine named her one of the 100 most influential people in the world. Margulies is also a recipient of a star on the Hollywood Walk of Fame.

Early life
Julianna Margulies was born in Spring Valley, New York, the youngest of three daughters. Her mother Francesca ( Goldberg, later Gardner) was a ballet dancer and eurythmy teacher. Her father Paul Margulies was a writer, philosopher, and Madison Avenue advertising executive. Her parents were both Jewish, descendants of Ashkenazi Jewish immigrants from Romania, Austria, Hungary, and Russia. They divorced when she was a year old.

In her memoir, Sunshine Girl, Margulies wrote that her parents both adhered to the teachings of anthroposophy. Margulies, herself, has said that she does not hold religious beliefs, although she is ethnically Jewish and teaches the traditions to her son. In a 2013 interview, she said, “I would say if I had a religion, it would be gratitude…I love the tradition of Judaism that on Friday nights, Shabbat means 'Goodbye to the workweek; hello to family and the weekend.'”

In her memoir, Margulies also wrote about her difficult, nomadic childhood. While she is from New York, she moved with her mother to many different countries and states throughout her youth, including Sussex, England, and Paris, France. As a result, French was Margulies’ first language. She has since lost the ability to speak it fluently.

In the book, Margulies described her childhood as ultimately loving, but unpredictable and unstable. She detailed many emotionally traumatic experiences.

Margulies attended many different schools as a child, including Green Meadow Waldorf School and High Mowing School. She graduated with a degree in art history and English from Sarah Lawrence College, where she appeared in several campus plays. At Sarah Lawrence College, students select three areas of focus for coursework. Margulies focused on art history, English, and theatre. She originally enrolled in college with the goal of becoming a lawyer, like her grandmother, or a psychologist, but fell in love with the craft of acting.

Career

1994–2000: Breakthrough and recognition with ER
Margulies made her feature film debut in Steven Seagal's action film Out for Justice (1991), playing a sex worker. In 1994, Margulies was cast in the pilot episode of the NBC medical drama ER as Carol Hathaway, an emergency care nurse who attempted suicide. Her character was originally intended to die; however, test audiences overwhelmingly wanted her to survive, so the producers changed the plot and made Carol Hathaway a main cast member.

At the time she was offered ER, Margulies had also been offered an extended role on NBC's Homicide: Life on the Streets, after a two-episode appearance earlier in the year. Then-unknown actor George Clooney, who had filmed the pilot episode with Margulies, called her to let her know that he had overheard producers saying that her character might survive the suicide attempt after all and become a series regular. He encouraged her to consider waiting for ER producers to call her and not take another job. Clooney was right and Margulies accepted the role on ER in 1994.

She remained on the show as a series regular for six seasons until 2000 and returned to the show for one episode during its final season in 2009. She won a Primetime Emmy Award for Outstanding Supporting Actress in a Drama Series in 1994, and continued to be nominated for an Emmy Award every year during her tenure on ER. She was the only series regular cast member to win a Primetime Emmy Award. She was also nominated four times for a Golden Globe Award during the show’s tenure.

Originally, Margulies had signed a five-year contract to work on ER. She extended the contract for a sixth year, but made the “very difficult, painful decision” to opt out of another renewal. In 2021, she explained in her memoir, Sunshine Girl, that she had been feeling homesick for New York after spending six years filming the show in Los Angeles. She wanted to return to theatre and take on a leading role in The Mists of Avalon, a miniseries based on a favorite childhood book.

In 2021, Margulies said during an interview with Michael Imperioli and Steve Schirripa, “I thought, didn’t I work six years on a show I loved — I loved being on ER, I was so grateful, and it was a great experience — but didn’t I work this hard to be able to do theatre for $235 a week without worrying about my rent?” She explained that, before NBC offered her a shocking $27 million to sign on for another two years, she had already helped plan out the conclusion of her character’s story arc on the show and mapped out a year’s worth of work for herself.

In a New York Times interview with Bill Carter, Margulies shared that another factor in her decision was a desire to protect her ER character, Carol Hathaway, from certain story changes that were happening as the show continued on into later years. She explained that she didn’t like how her character became the focus of too much romance whenever she wasn’t with George Clooney’s character, and that all of the research she had previously done in order to play the character was then undone by certain storylines.

Margulies recalled, “I’ll never forget, there was a line [in the script] where [my character] says, ‘I had to share a bathroom with seven sisters.’ I was like, guys, I’ve been playing her as an only child for six years…I had actually done research on what it’s like to be an only child. I was starting to feel very sad about a character I loved so much. It started to become very clear to me that without George, my character was just going to be the liaison to flashy sort of bits of things instead of one fluent, cognizant thought and I felt sad about it.”

Had Margulies accepted the $27 million contract for a seventh and eighth year of ER, it would have made her one of the highest paid women on television. The actress said that she received intense, hurtful backlash for her decision to ultimately leave ER, but was “doing what fed me, as an actor,” she said in 2021. “And keeping my promises to playwrights and directors who I’d already made a commitment to.”

Margulies had previously broken her silence on her decision in 2012. She revealed that although everyone said it would be "career suicide" not to return to the medical drama, she was never concerned about the consequences:

In an interview with TV Guide, she further explained, "I felt like I had a great character and I did as much as I could do with her, but I was feeling bored. I wasn't excited about the work and I certainly didn't want to go out with a bomb, but as an inspiration."

2000–2009: Film, television, and stage roles
In February 2000, Margulies hosted an episode of the NBC late-night sketch series Saturday Night Live. She brought on ER co-star Noah Wyle for one of the show’s sketches.

After leaving ER as a series regular, Margulies worked on stage and screen. On stage, she appeared in a MCC Theater production of Kate Robin's Intrigue With Faye, a Lincoln Center production of Jon Robin Baitz's Ten Unknowns, and The Vagina Monologues.

Her work after ER included the 2002 films Evelyn, with Pierce Brosnan, and Ghost Ship, with Gabriel Byrne and Ron Eldard. She starred as Morgaine, the protagonist and narrator of the TNT miniseries The Mists of Avalon (2001) and participated in the documentary film Searching for Debra Winger (2002).

In 2004, she guest-starred in a two-episode arc in season four of the hit NBC comedy series Scrubs as Neena Broderick, an unscrupulous lawyer who sues Turk and has a brief sexual relationship with J.D. That same year, she starred in another miniseries on TNT, The Grid. In April 2006, she appeared in four episodes of the sixth season of the HBO crime drama series The Sopranos, portraying realtor Julianna Skiff. In August 2006, she appeared alongside Samuel L. Jackson in the action film Snakes on a Plane, as flight attendant Claire Miller. In December 2006, she played Jennifer Bloom in the Syfy Channel miniseries The Lost Room.

In an August 2006 interview with tvguide.com, Margulies said she was close to accepting an offer to return to ER for a four-episode arc, with Noah Wyle, that filmed in Hawaii during the 2005/06 season. However, she decided against it at the last minute. "I left on very good terms with [ER exec producer] John Wells, and every year they ask me back and I love that they do," she told TV Guide in 2006. "So, at the last minute, I went, 'John, thank you and keep asking, because you never know, but no.'" 

Margulies was invited to return during ER'''s final season. The actress hesitated, saying she felt like she left Carol Hathaway in the perfect place and could not imagine bettering her departure episode, but Margulies did return to ER for one more episode during its 15th and final season.

In a 2013 interview, she said of her appearance, “I called George up and said, ‘If you do it, I’ll do it.’ We were both very aware we had careers because of that show, and we also loved those characters. I remember walking on to the Warner Brothers lot, and they asked for my ID. I used to have my picture on the wall there. It was a little surreal, but a lovely way to come full circle.”

Margulies had a minor role in the film The Darwin Awards (2007). In 2008, Margulies starred in the legal series Canterbury's Law, a Fox mid-season replacement show. She played the title character, Elizabeth Canterbury, a lawyer. She was also credited as a producer of the show. The series was severely affected by the 2007–2008 Writers Guild of America strike; it was cancelled by the network after only six episodes.

2009–present: The Good Wife and further acclaim
In 2009, after returning to ER for one episode during its 15th and final season, Margulies began starring in the CBS legal drama series The Good Wife. She played Alicia Florrick, an attorney returning to legal practice after her husband Peter Florrick (played by Chris Noth) resigned as Illinois State's Attorney amid a sex and corruption scandal. She won two Primetime Emmy Awards and a Golden Globe Award for the series. Beginning in 2011, starting with the third season, Margulies was credited as a producer of The Good Wife. The series ended in May 2016.

Reflecting on her roles as Alicia on The Good Wife and as Carol on ER, Margulies told Entertainment Weekly in 2021, “I have gotten to play two of the richest, I think, female characters on television.” In a 2019 interview for the Series Mania Festival, Margulies said that "it's tied between Carol Hathaway and Alicia Florrick" when it comes to the role she is most proud of having played.

Since 2013, the actress has done voiceovers for a Chase credit card commercial. In 2014, Margulies narrated "Women in Business", an episode of season 2 of the documentary series Makers: Women Who Make America. In 2015, TIME featured Margulies as one of the "100 Most Influential People in the World". It noted her work to get Erin's Law, concerned with child sexual abuse, passed in every US state.

In 2018, Margulies co-starred in the dark comedy series Dietland on AMC as Kitty Montgomery—a nasty, razor-thin fashionista who employs an overweight woman for menial tasks and enjoys torturing her constantly (especially about her weight). Despite positive reviews, the series was cancelled after one season.

In 2019, Margulies starred in the National Geographic series The Hot Zone, as Dr. Nancy Jaax—a U.S Army scientist Nancy Jaax, DVM, ACVP, trying to stop a deadly outbreak of Ebola. The limited series put up large rating numbers for the Disney-owned cable network, becoming the highest-rated scripted series in National Geographic's history and ranking second among all series.

In 2019, Margulies was slated to reprise the role of Alicia Florrick for three episodes of The Good Fight, a spin-off of The Good Wife. However, negotiations broke down over the question of Margulies' salary, with CBS offering to pay her at the guest star rate instead of the same rate she had been paid on The Good Wife. She stated that: "I watch the show, I love the show. But I'm not a guest star. You don't pay me a guest-star salary. I would get a guest-star salary if I went and did SVU—it's not my show. I wouldn't ask for what I got paid as Alicia Florrick. I also know for a fact that any male star who got asked to go on a spinoff of his show would have been offered at least $500,000. I know that for a fact."

In November 2019, Margulies guest starred in the Showtime drama series Billions. She played Catherine Brant, who is described as an Ivy League sociology professor and bestselling author.

In December 2020, Margulies joined the second season of the AppleTV+ drama series The Morning Show as Laura Peterson, an anchor at UBA News. She joined returning series stars Jennifer Aniston and Reese Witherspoon.

In 2021, Margulies appeared with many of her former ER cast members in a virtual cast reunion show that benefited the Waterkeeper Alliance charity.

Writing

Margulies published a picture book with Random House Children's Books in May 2016. Titled Three Magic Balloons, the story is based on one that the actress's father, Paul Margulies, wrote for her and her sisters. In October 2020, Margulies announced on her Instagram that she was writing an autobiography, Sunshine Girl: An Unexpected Life'', published by Ballantine Books. She had originally intended to write an acting handbook about set etiquette, but ended up writing a memoir, instead. The book chronicles her nomadic childhood and journey to becoming an actress. Her book was released on May 4, 2021. Margulies also recorded the audiobook. A paperback version with additional chapters is set to be released in May 2022.

Personal life
From 1991 to 2003, Margulies was in a relationship with actor Ron Eldard, whom she met in an acting class.

On November 10, 2007, Margulies married attorney Keith Lieberthal, the son of academic Kenneth Lieberthal, in Lenox, Massachusetts. They have a son, Kieran Lindsay Lieberthal. They reside in Manhattan. The couple also owns a country house in Upstate New York.

Margulies is on the board of the MCC Theater Company in New York City. She is also a supporter of research on amyotrophic lateral sclerosis through Project ALS, as well as Erin’s Law. In 2022, she hosted the Physicians for Human Rights virtual gala, “A Celebration of Health and Human Rights Heroes”.

Filmography

Film

Television

Theatre

Awards and nominations

References

External links

 
 
 

1966 births
Actresses from New York City
American film actresses
American people of Austrian-Jewish descent
American people of Hungarian-Jewish descent
American people of Romanian-Jewish descent
American people of Russian-Jewish descent
American stage actresses
American television actresses
Best Drama Actress Golden Globe (television) winners
Jewish American actresses
Living people
People from Spring Valley, New York
Outstanding Performance by a Lead Actress in a Drama Series Primetime Emmy Award winners
Outstanding Performance by a Supporting Actress in a Drama Series Primetime Emmy Award winners
Outstanding Performance by a Female Actor in a Drama Series Screen Actors Guild Award winners
People from Manhattan 
Sarah Lawrence College alumni
Waldorf school alumni
Television producers from New York City
American women television producers
American voice actresses
Ashkenazi Jews